The 2012–13 season of the Primera División de Fútbol Sala was the 24th season of top-tier futsal in Spain. It was the second season under the "Primera División" name. The regular season started on September 14, 2012 and finished on May 3, 2013. The championship playoffs began on May 18 with quarter-finals series and concluded with the championship final series from 11–22 June.

Top eight teams play the championship playoffs.

Barcelona Alusport were defending champions and will remain so for next season by defeating ElPozo Murcia 3–1 in the Championship Final series.

Teams

Personnel and kits

Stadia and locations

League table

Puertollano; 4 points deducted.  
Source: Liga Nacional de Futbol Sala

Championship playoffs

Calendar

Bracket

Quarter-finals

1st leg

2nd leg

FC Barcelona Alusport won series 2–0 and advanced to Semifinals

Inter Movistar won series 2–0 and advanced to Semifinals

Caja Segovia won series 2–0 and advanced to Semifinals

3rd leg

ElPozo Murcia won series 2–1 and advanced to Semifinals

Semifinals

1st leg

2nd leg

3rd leg

FC Barcelona Alusport won series 2–1 and advanced to Final

ElPozo Murcia won series 2–1 and advanced to Final

Final

1st leg

2nd leg

3rd leg

4th leg

Top scorers

See also
2012–13 Segunda División de Futsal
2012–13 Copa del Rey de Futsal
Futsal in Spain

References

External links
2012–13 season at lnfs.es

Liga Nacional de Fútbol Sala seasons
1
Futsal
Spain